DXOL (92.7 FM), broadcasting as 92.7 Happy FM, is an FM station owned and operated by Notre Dame Broadcasting Corporation, the media arm of the Missionary Oblates of Mary Immaculate. The station is located along Sinsuat Ave., Cotabato City. It is the first FM station in the city. It is a 24-hour operating station, except on Sundays where it signs off from midnight to 5:00 AM.

References

External links
 

Radio stations in Cotabato City
Radio stations established in 1986